is a Japanese idol, singer, and model. She was represented by Amuse, Inc. from 2004 to 2015, and has been a member of three musical groups formed by the company: Karen Girl's, Sakura Gakuin, and its first sub-unit Twinklestars.

Biography 
Mutō was born in a hospital in Ikebukuro, Toshima, Tokyo, on April 29, 1996. Her father, Yoshinori Mutō is a horse trainer, and her younger brother Miyabi Mutō is a horse jockey.

Joining the talent agency Amuse, Inc. in 2004, Mutō began her career as a child model for the magazine Kids Style. In 2008, she joined the idol group Karen Girl's alongside Suzuka Nakamoto and Yuika Shima. The trio was active for one year.

In 2010, Mutō and Nakamoto joined idol group Sakura Gakuin, as one of the founding members, and as the Student Council President in the school theme of the group. Later that year, Mutō joined the group's first sub-unit Twinklestars, which acts as a school baton-twirling club. On March 25, 2012, she graduated from Sakura Gakuin.

In April 2013, Mutō began a solo project, releasing her first double cover EP, DNA1980, in July, coinciding with a series of headlining shows. In 2014, she returned to the stage to begin a solo career in major, releasing her first studio album, Eien to Shunkan, in April.

On December 16, 2015, Mutō announced on her Twitter and her profile page on Amuse that she would be going on hiatus. She continues to periodically release song covers on her personal YouTube channel.

On October 25, 2018 Mutō announced on Twitter that she will be returning to performing live on December 1, 2018.

Discography

Studio albums

Live albums

EPs

Videography

Video albums

Filmography

Music videos

References

External links 
  
  

Sakura Gakuin members
1996 births
Living people
Japanese idols
Japanese women singers
Musicians from Ibaraki Prefecture
A-Sketch artists